Asbury United Methodist Church or Asbury Methodist Episcopal Church, or variations on Asbury Methodist Church, may refer to:

in the United States (by state then city)
Asbury Methodist Church (Denver, Colorado), a Denver Landmark
Old Asbury Methodist Church, Wilmington, Delaware, listed on the National Register of Historic Places (NRHP)
Asbury Methodist Episcopal Church (Allen, Maryland), NRHP-listed
Mount Vernon Place United Methodist Church and Asbury House, Baltimore, Maryland, NRHP-listed
Asbury United Methodist Church (Chesterfield, New Hampshire), NRHP-listed
Asbury United Methodist Church (Asbury, New Jersey), NRHP-listed
New Asbury Methodist Episcopal Meetinghouse, Cape May Court House, New Jersey, NRHP-listed
Asbury United Methodist Church and Bethel Chapel and Cemetery, Croton-on-Hudson, New York, NRHP-listed
Asbury Methodist Church (Raynham, North Carolina), listed on the NRHP in Robeson County, North Carolina
Asbury United Methodist Church (Savannah, Georgia), located in the NRHP-listed Savannah Victorian Historic District
Asbury United Methodist Church (Tulsa, Oklahoma)
Asbury United Methodist Church (Chattanooga, Tennessee)
Asbury United Methodist Church (Knoxville, Tennessee), formerly Asbury Methodist Episcopal Church, South
Asbury United Methodist Church (Washington, D.C.), NRHP-listed
Asbury United Methodist Church (Raleigh, North Carolina), Raleigh, North Carolina, probably the most well-known Asbury United Methodist Church. 
Syracuse, New York's is the "Little Utica Methodist Church."